Tiruvur is a town in NTR district formerly Krishna district of the Indian state of Andhra Pradesh. It is a nagar panchayat in Tiruvur mandal of Tiruvur revenue division.

Governance 

Tiruvuru municipality is the civic administrative body of the town. The Municipality has a total of 20 wards, with seventeen wards reserved and three unreserved. The reserved wards include general and women reservations in SC, ST and BC. The municipal chairman is M.Krishna Kumari and vice chairman is S.Venkata Narasimha Rao.

Politics 

Tiruvuru falls under the administration of Tiruvuru mandal and is represented by the Tiruvuru (SC) Assembly constituency, which in turn represents Andhra Pradeshs Vijayawada Lok Sabha constituency.  the MLA representing Tiruvuru constituency is Kokkiligadda Rakshana Nidhi of the YSR Congress Party.

Economy

Agriculture is the main occupation. The Mango orchards are in abundant with Banginapalli, Totapuri varieties. These are exported to cities namely Dubai, Hongkong, London and Singapore.

Transport 

Madhira is the nearest railway station to the village. It is administered under Secunderabad railway division of the South Central Railway zone. NH 30 passes through the town, which connects Vijayawada in Andhra Pradesh to Jagadalpur in Chhattisgarh.
APSRTC Bus service are also here.

References 

Cities and towns in NTR district

2011 census
http://dataforall.org/dashboard/censusinfoindia_pca/